Cerro Bayo is a complex volcano on the northern part border between Argentina and Chile. It consists of four overlapping stratovolcanoes along a north–south line. The main volcano fauce is located on the Argentine side, thought the summit of the complex is just west of the border, in Chile. The volcano is about 800,000 years old, but it is associated with ongoing ground uplift encompassing also the more northerly Lastarria and Cordón del Azufre volcanoes. In 2007 a steam eruption were observed by researchers investigating nearby salt pans such as Salar Ignorado.

See also
List of volcanoes in Chile
List of volcanoes in Argentina
List of mountains in the Andes
Los Colorados (caldera)

References 

  (in Spanish; also includes volcanoes of Argentina, Bolivia, and Peru)
 
 

Complex volcanoes
Volcanoes of Atacama Region
Volcanoes of Catamarca Province
Mountains of Argentina
Mountains of Chile
Polygenetic volcanoes
Subduction volcanoes
Argentina–Chile border
International mountains of South America
Five-thousanders of the Andes